The Outsiders were a Dutch band from Amsterdam. Their period of greatest popularity in the Netherlands was from 1965–67, but they released records until 1969.  In recent years their legacy has extended beyond the Netherlands, and the group is today recognized as a distinctive exemplars of the garage rock genre.

Career overview

Featuring Wally Tax (vocals), Ronnie Splinter (guitar), Appie Rammers (bass guitar), Tom Krabbendam (guitar), Leendert "Buzz" Busch (drums), and Frank Beek (bass guitar 1968-1969), the band exemplified the "Nederbeat Sound", a raw, Dutch take on rock 'n' roll created in the wake of the 1960s British Invasion. Unlike the many European bands influenced by The Beatles, The Outsiders took their cues from harder-edged British groups like The Pretty Things (who frequently toured the Netherlands) and The Rolling Stones. In March 26, 1966, in 's-Hertogenbosch, The Outsiders opened for Stones' second Dutch concert.

The Outsiders released three full-length records, Outsiders and the singles collection Songbook in 1967, and C.Q. in 1968. The latter sold poorly upon release but is now considered a masterpiece of psychedelic garage rock.  The band also released thirteen singles, including 1967's "Summer Is Here," which reached the Top Ten on the Dutch charts. Their eponymous debut album, which featured one side of studio recordings and another taken from their live show, also sold well during this period.  Unusually for this era, the band never recorded any covers. While several Dutch pop groups of the era — namely Tee Set ("Ma Belle Amie"), Shocking Blue ("Venus"), and the George Baker Selection ("Little Green Bag") — all had hits in the United States on the Colossus label, resulting in what some music pundits jokingly called the "Dutch Invasion," the Outsiders were unable to join in on this success as their records were never released in the U.S.

The final year, reunions
After the summer of '67, many of the Nederbeat bands fell from commercial favor, including The Outsiders.  Later, Outsiders singles had lower chart peaks, and personnel changes, friction, poor promotion and management problems followed. Experiments and changes in musical style, though critically well-regarded today, only served to alienate the band's fanbase. The group began attempting publicity stunts in the hopes of building interest. These included dressing in medieval costumes, and staging a haircut for lead singer Wally Tax on Dutch television.

By autumn of 1969, Ronnie Splinter quit music for a while. The band disbanded, with Tax and Busch forming Tax Free, in the early 1970s, in U.S., where they recorded one album.

A reunion tour of the four original Outsiders took place in October 1997. Wally Tax died in 2005.

Appie Rammers and Leen Busch were active with Tax & The Outsiders (revival band) from April 2015 to early 2017, together with Tycho Tax (vocals), Yuri Tax (guitar) and Mick Langenberg (guitar).

Legacy
The Outsiders are the subject of an official biography, Outsiders voor Insiders (1997), written in Dutch by Jerome Blanes; the English version Outsiders by Insiders was published in December 2009 by Misty Lane Books in Italy. Two collections of photographs, The Outsiders Picture Book, Volume 1 and The Outsiders Picture Book, Volume 2 and two scrapbooks with articles have also been published.

Reportedly, Kurt Cobain was a fan of the Outsiders and made an unsuccessful attempt to meet Wally Tax.

When the Clash first formed they called themselves the Outsiders. A friend then showed them a record by the Outsiders, and they changed their name to the Clash.

Discography

Singles 
"You Mistreat Me"/"Sun's Going Down" (Muziek Express Op-Art ME 1003) 1965
"Felt Like I Wanted to Cry"/"I Love Her Still I Always Will" (Muziek Express Op-Art ME 1006) 1966
"Lying All the Time"/"Thinking About Today" (Relax 45004) 1966 (No. 10 NL)
"Keep on Trying"/"That's Your Problem" (Relax 45006) 1966 (No. 9 NL)
"Touch"/"Ballad of John B" (Relax 45016) 1966 (No. 6 NL)
"Monkey on Your Back"/"What's Wrong With You" (Relax 45025) 1967 (No. 4 NL)
"Summer is Here"/"Teach Me to Forget You" (Relax 45048) 1967 (No. 8 NL)
"I've Been Loving You So Long"/"I'm Only Trying to Prove to Myself That I'm Not Like Everybody Else" (Relax 45058) 1967 (No. 29 NL)
"Don't You Worry About Me"/"Bird in a Cage" (Relax 45068) 1967 (No. 32 NL)
"A Cup of Hot Coffee"/"Strange Things Are Happening" (Relax 45088) 1968
"I Don't Care"/"You Remind Me" (Polydor S 1266) 1968
"Do You Feel Alright"/"Daddy Died on Saturday" (Polydor S 1300) 1968
"Hits Come Back" (Imperial 5C 006 24835) 1973

Albums 
You Mistreat Me EP (Relax 11.001) 1966
Outsiders (Relax 30.007) 1967
CQ (Polydor 236 803) 1968
The Outsiders EP (Beat Crazy BC 001) 1994

Compilations 
Songbook (Teenbeat APLP 102) 1967
Golden Greats of The Outsiders (Bovema Negram 5N028-26197) 1979
CQ (Complete Polydor Tapes) (Pseudonym CDP-1010-DD) 1993

References

External links
 Tax and the Outsiders (Dutch)
 Official website of the Outsiders (Dutch)
 Official Biography of The Outsiders by Jerome Blanes in Dutch and English language: 'Outsiders by Insiders'

Nederpop
Dutch psychedelic rock music groups
Beat groups
Musical groups established in 1965
Musical groups disestablished in 1969
Dutch garage rock groups